Đồng Hới is the capital city of Quảng Bình Province in the north central coast of Vietnam. Population as per the 2017 census was 119,222. It is served by National Highway 1A, the Đồng Hới Railway Station, and airport. It borders Quảng Ninh District on the west and south, the South China Sea on the east, Bố Trạch District on the north.

Đồng Hới has a 12-km-long coastline with white sand beaches. It is the closest city to Phong Nha-Kẻ Bàng National Park, UNESCO's World Natural Heritage Site, 50 km north.

History
Archaeological excavation in this area proved that humans lived in what is now Quảng Bình province in the Stone Age. Many artifacts, such as ceramic vases, stone tools, and china, have been unearthed in Quảng Bình.

In 1926, French archaeologist Madeleine Colani discovered and excavated many artifacts in caves and grottoes in west mountainous areas of Quảng Bình. She concluded that the Hòa Bình culture existed in this region. Through C14 testing, the artifacts dated back to 10,509 (plus or minus 950) years ago. From Quy Đạt township (Tuyên Hóa District) to south-west about 150 m, the Hum grotto contains many stone tools and animal stones from an ancient human community. Inside Khai grotto near the Quy Đạt township, similar artifacts were found, including ceramics from Đông Sơn culture. Additionally, artifacts of the Stone Age were unearthed in grottoes in the Quảng Bình region. Owners of these artifacts lived in the caves and grottoes and hunted for their food.

Human settlement in Đồng Hới can be traced 5,000 years back. Many relics and remnants have been found in Bau Tro, a lake in the city, most of which date to the Stone Age. Around  2880 BC, the site of modern Đồng Hới was a territory of the Viet Thuong tribe of Văn Lang during the reign of king Hùng Vương. The site was a long-disputed territory between the Champa kingdom and Đại Việt. It officially became Đại Việt territory in 1069 after Lý Thường Kiệt took victory over Champa as a result of the Đại Việt-Champa War (1069).

The area ceased to be the southernmost of Đại Việt following the political marriage of the Trần dynasty princess, Huyền Trân, to Champa king, Jaya Sinhavarman III (Vietnamese: Chế Mân). Princess Huyền Trân was king Trần Nhân Tông's daughter and king Trần Anh Tông's younger sister. Political matches made to acquire land was a traditional practice by Champa kings. Thanks to this marriage, Đại Việt acquired lands (as dowry) of what is now Quảng Trị Province and Thừa Thiên–Huế Province (provinces which were then known respectively as Chau O and Chau Ri or Chau Ly).

During the time of the Trịnh–Nguyễn War (1558–1775), Vietnam was divided into two countries: Dang Trong (South) and Dang Ngoai (North) with the Gianh River as frontier line. Đồng Hới was an important fortress of the southern Nguyễn lords. The Đồng Hới Wall (Vietnamese: Thành Đồng Hới) was considered the barrier that protected the Nguyễn lords from the attack by the northern Trịnh family.

During the First Indochina War (between the French and the Viet Minh in the 1950s), the Đồng Hới airbase was used by the French to attack the Viet Minh in north-central Vietnam and the Laotian Pathet Lao army in central and southern Laos. During the Vietnam War, Đồng Hới was heavily devastated by bombardments from United States B-52 bombers due to its location near the 17th parallel and the DMZ between North Vietnam and South Vietnam.

On February 11, 1965, bombing destroyed much of the city. The Tam Tòa Church, a Catholic cathedral, was severely damaged. Today the bell tower remains near the town center as a monument.
They were attacked by three North Vietnamese MiG aircraft in the Battle of Đồng Hới. In an attempt to surprise the task force, the MiGs came in low, described as "getting their feet wet." Despite the official stories, they did not surprise the task force, which had spotted them long before engagement range and were ready to shoot. Two ships, Oklahoma City and Sterett, had anti-aircraft missiles, while Higbee and Lloyd Thomas were armed with dual purpose  guns. All ships were at battle stations.

This city is the narrowest land of Vietnam (around 40 km from the east to the west). After the fall of Saigon on 30 April 1975, Quảng Bình province was merged into Bình Trị Thiên province (Bình Trị Thiên is the abbreviation of Quảng Bình, Quảng Trị, and Thừa Thiên provinces). In 1990, Bình Trị Thiên was once again separated into three provinces as it had been before. Đồng Hới then became the capital of Quảng Bình province.

Geography

Location

Đồng Hới is on the National Route 1, North–South Railway, and Ho Chi Minh Highway, at the coordinates 17 21' N and 106 10’ E. This city is in the heart of Quảng Bình Province. It borders Bố Trạch on the north, Quảng Ninh on the south, the South China Sea on the east and Quảng Ninh on the west. It is 50 km south of Phong Nha-Kẻ Bàng National Park, 50 km north of Bang Spa, 180 km south-east of Cha Lo border gate with Laos. It has a coastline of 12 km. Nhật Lệ River is the only river that runs through the city. Tro Lake is the source of fresh water. The Nhật Lệ Beach is endowed with fine and white sand.

Transportation
There are many ways to get to Dong Hoi from Hue, such as local bus at Hue North Bus Station. There are taxis from city center bus station (6 km). The bus fare is around $8. It takes 3.5 hours to drive to Dong Hoi/Quang Binh Town.

Climate
Like all provinces in north and north central Vietnam, there are four distinct seasons in Đồng Hới. The city sees three types of wind: south-east (gió nồm), south-west (gió Lào), and north-east.

In the “spring”, Đồng Hới is very warm, humid and foggy. Although the city is by the sea, its climate is subject to drought and heat in the summer. This is largely due to the dry south-west wind from Gulf of Thailand. This flow of wind is wet but when it passes onto Vietnam, the Annamite Range releases its moisture to cause rains in Laos but drought in central Vietnam. It is rainy in the northeast monsoon (“fall”) and the weather is very warm although with extremely high relative humidity due to the moist air from the northeast monsoon. In the winter, due to the north-east wind blowing from the Siberia  mainland, the temperature may go down below , and there may be slight rain. The highest rainfall occurs in October, compared to just  in Februarys. The highest temperature recorded was 42.2 °C in May 1914, while the lowest was 6.7 °C on 24 January 2016.

Topography and geology
The city has diverse topographical and geological features, including hill, mountainous, half mountainous, coastal plains and coastal sand dunes.

The hilly region is in the west, stretching from north to south (in parts of communes: Dong Son, Thuan Duc) with an average elevation of 12–15 m, with total area of 64.93 km2, 41.7% of the city total area. Residents here live on agriculture, forestry, farming. The soil in this area is poor in nutrition, infertile and subject to continuous erosion due to its slope of 7-10%.

The half hilly region surrounds a plain with an average elevation of 10 m from north-east - north to north-west – south-west and south – south-east. This region covers commues and wards of Bắc Lý, Nam Lý, Nghĩa Ninh, Bắc Nghĩa, Đức Ninh, Đức Ninh Đông, Lộc Ninh and Phú Hải with total area of 62.87 km2, or accounts for 40.2% of the city total area. Residents here lives on industrial, handcraft, trading and a small percentage lives on farming. This region is not very fertile, subject to alum. However, thanks to the heavy distribution of rivers and lakes, ponds and pools, it's better for agriculture than the hilly region. The plain with the average of 2.1 m, with little slope, accounting for 0.2% of the city area (5.76 km2). Most of the city's commercial, administrative and main streets concentrate in this narrow regions. Coastal sand dune area is on the east of the city, with an area of 21.98 km2, making up 14,3% of the total area.

Administration
Đồng Hới is subdivided into 16 subdivisions: 10 urban wards (phường) and 6 rural communes (xã).

Tourism

Đồng Hới is endowed with beautiful beaches with fine sand and clean water of Nhật Lệ. The Da Nhay and Ly Hoa beaches (60 km north of the city) are popular tourist destinations. The Bang Spa (hot mineral spring) is ideal for those who enjoy spa baths. The city is 50 km south of the World Heritage Phong Nha-Kẻ Bàng National Park which is ideal for cave and grotto exploration and biological research activities (mainly Phong Nha Cave and, from September 2010, Thiên Đường Cave and Sơn Đoòng Cave are available for visitors).

Đồng Hới is included in former battlefield tours where travelers can visit once-dangerous fields along the Annamite Range and the Hồ Chí Minh trail.

Đồng Hới is accessible by road (National Route 1 (Vietnam) - Asian Highway 1, Hồ Chí Minh Highway), by rail at Đồng Hới Railway Station on the Hà Nội–Hồ Chí Minh City Railway, or by air from Hà Nội or Hồ Chí Minh City at Đồng Hới Airport. 

Đồng Hới Airport was put into use on 18 May 2008, and the first commercial flight was from Hanoi's Noi Bai International Airport, followed by air link with Ho Chi Minh City's Tân Sơn Nhất International Airport from 1 July 2009.

The city provides tourists with 98 hotels and guest-houses from 1 to 3-star hotels like Cosevco Hotel (which is closed and not available for booking), Saigon-Quảng Bình Hotel, Nam Long Hotel and Nam Long Plus Hotel (all available for online booking through several sites) and the 4-star resort of Sun Spa Resort. The cuisine includes seafood, the traditional "hot pot", Vietnamese and European-style meals. In 2005, the city welcomed nearly 300,000 visitors.
Flagstick broke ground on another new project on February 1 – FLC Dong Hoi Golf Links in Quang Binh Province.

A complex of 10 contiguous golf courses, three clubhouses, more than 1,000 villas, a large resort hotel, commercial village and convention centre is under construction in seaside area of Dong Hoi and Quang Ninh District, Le Thuy District, which is scheduled to achieve the completion of all construction of the first phase by November 2016, with spring 2017 set as the opening date for play.

Economy
The Hòn La bay is 4-km2, with the depth up to 15 m, suitable to develop into a deep-water sea port. A port is currently under construction north of Đồng Hới. When finished it will be able to accommodate ships up to 50,000 metric tons, on a 32ha of land, has a loading capacity of 10-12 million tonnes per year and is expected to facilitate business for Quảng Bình's industrial and economic zones.

Two industrial parks (north-west Đồng Hới Industrial Park and Hòn La Industrial Park) are under construction and partially available to investors. The city achieved an average economic growth rate of 12.32% during 2010–2013 period. The economic contributors for 2013 were as follows: industry and construction accounting for 35.5%, services 50.9%, agriculture-forestry-fishery 13.6%. GDP per capita in 2015 was $3871,3.

Education
Đồng Hới is home to Quảng Bình University, a multidisciplinary university. There are several schools here, notably Võ Nguyên Giáp Gifted High School, and Đào Duy Từ High School.

See also 
 Đồng Hới Citadel

References

External links 
 
 
 Đồng Hới town became city
 Website office of Đồng Hới city
 Đồng Hới on wikimapia
 Đồng Hới by images

 
Populated places in Quảng Bình province
Districts of Quảng Bình province
Cities in Vietnam
Provincial capitals in Vietnam